Omer Peretz (born 26 January 1986) is an Israeli former professional footballer who now works as the manager of Hapoel Kfar Saba.

He is most known for playing at Hapoel Tel Aviv, Maccabi Tel Aviv and Maccabi Netanya.

His father, Vicky, was also a footballer who played the Israeli Premier League and in Ligue 1. Both his late uncle, Avi Cohen and his cousin Tamir Cohen played in the Israeli Premier League and the English Premier League.

Managerial statistics

Honours
 Israel State Cup: 2006; runner-up 2014
 Liga Leumit: 2013–14

References

1986 births
Living people
Israeli Jews
Israeli footballers
Association football forwards
Hapoel Tel Aviv F.C. players
Maccabi Tel Aviv F.C. players
Hapoel Ironi Kiryat Shmona F.C. players
Hapoel Ramat Gan F.C. players
Maccabi Herzliya F.C. players
Sektzia Ness Ziona F.C. players
Maccabi Netanya F.C. players
Israeli Premier League players
Liga Leumit players
Israel under-21 international footballers
Israeli expatriate footballers
Expatriate footballers in France
Israeli expatriate sportspeople in France
Footballers from Tel Aviv
Israeli football managers
Maccabi Netanya F.C. managers
Hakoah Amidar Ramat Gan F.C. managers
Hapoel Rishon LeZion F.C. managers
Hapoel Kfar Saba F.C. managers
Israeli people of Moroccan-Jewish descent